"All of You" is a song recorded by Australian recording artist Betty Who. The song first appeared on SoundCloud in December 2013, and was later re-recorded and included on her debut studio album, Take Me When You Go (2014). 
The video was released in January 2015 and a remix single on 10 March 2015.

On 21 February 2015, "All of You" became Who's second number one single on the Billboard Dance/Club Play Songs chart.

Critical reception
Sam Lansky from Idolator said "All of You" is “a deliriously euphoric dance-pop gem that rushes and crashes gloriously”.

Music videos
A music video for "All of You" was released on YouTube on 8 January 2015.

Track listings
2015 remixes
 "All of You" (Hector Fonseca Remix) – 5:11
 "All of You" (Wideboys Remix) – 3:25
 "All of You" (The Jane Doze Remix radio edit) – 3:45
 "All of You" (The Love Club Remix) – 5:02
 "All of You" (Shèmce Remix) – 5:21

Charts

References

2014 songs
2015 singles
Betty Who songs
RCA Records singles
Sony Music singles